Nonpartisan Local Government Activists (BS) is a Polish political movement. Operating mainly at a regional level in a decentralised manner, it participates in elections as a national committee joining the individual regional counterparts. The organisation initially started out in the Lower Silesian Voivodeship before expanding to the rest of the country.

History

Local elections 2014 
The BS Committee won 4 seats in the Lower Silesia Voivodship. Party chairman Robert Raczyński was re-elected as president of Lubin (again starting from his own committee). In addition to Robert Raczyński, the president of the city from among candidates associated with BS, member Piotr Roman was also elected in Bolesławiec. In the Wrocław city council, the only seat for the BS was won by Sebastian Lorenc.

Local elections 2018 
In the elections in 2018 to regional assemblies, BS gained 5.28% of the vote and won 15 seats in five voivodeships. In the Lower Silesian Voivodeship, they obtained 14.98% of votes, gaining 6 seats. As a result of their decision, PiS came to power in this voivodeship in which BS member Cezary Przybylski maintained the seat of the voivodeship marshal. In the West Pomeranian Voivodeship, BS obtained 13.7% of votes. They did not enter the voivodship board, however, and supported the PO, with their member Maria Ilnicka-Mądry becoming the president of the regional council. BS managed to establish their own club in the Lubusz Regional Assembly, where they scored 4 seats on the result of 13.17% of the vote (however, the councilor Wioleta Haręźlak, who was elected from their list, eventually left and joined the PSL, becoming the chairman of the regional council). BS found themselves in opposition in Masovian Voivodeship and Greater Poland Voivodeship, where their committee gained slightly more than 6% of votes, and its representatives obtained one mandate each. BS has won two mayoral seats and one sheriff seat, as well as 36 seats in county councils, 53 in municipal councils, and one in a district of Warsaw. Candidates associated with the movement also ran under other committees' names in some instances—among them are some presidents of cities who obtained re-election: the leader of the movement, Robert Raczyński, as well as Piotr Krzystek, Janusz Kubicki and Piotr Roman.

References

External links
Official website

Liberal parties in Poland
Political parties in Poland
Regionalist parties